John Quayle is the name of the following people:
John Quayle (actor) (born 1938), English actor 
John Quayle (advocate, b. 1693) (1693–1755), Manx lawyer who became the Clerk of the Rolls on the Isle of Man
John Quayle (Judge, b. 1725), Manx-born advocate who succeeded his father as Clerk of the Rolls
John Quayle (politician) (1868 – 1930), American politician
John Quayle (rugby league) (born 1947), Australian rugby league footballer and administrator